Daydreaming on Company Time was the first collection of stories by Australian horror writer Rob Hood. The volume includes fantasy tales like the title story and crime tales as well as horror tales of dislocated psyches, all told with a quirky black sense of humour. It includes the powerful “Juggernaut” (about an inexplicable and destructive Object), as well as strong horror tales like “Last Remains’, and “Necropolis” The book was runner-up for Best Single Author Collection in the 1990 Readercon Imaginative Fiction Awards (USA).

1988 short story collections
Horror short story collections
Australian short story collections